Philippe Bonnin (born 30 April 1955) is a French fencer. He won a gold medal in the team foil at the 1980 Summer Olympics.

References

External links
 

1955 births
Living people
French male foil fencers
Olympic fencers of France
Fencers at the 1980 Summer Olympics
Olympic gold medalists for France
Olympic medalists in fencing
Medalists at the 1980 Summer Olympics
20th-century French people